Relic Hunter is a Canadian television series, starring Tia Carrere and Christien Anholt.

It centers on Sydney Fox, a professor who is also a globe-trotting "relic hunter" who looks for ancient artifacts to return to museums and/or the descendants of the original owner. She is aided by her linguistic assistant Nigel and occasionally by her somewhat air-headed secretary Claudia. She often ends up battling rival hunters seeking out artifacts for monetary gain. The series includes fantasy and science fiction elements, with many of the relics featured having supposed supernatural powers or being pieces of unusually advanced technology.

It ran for three seasons in the U.S. between 1999 and 2002, fulfilling its initial three-season, 66-episode contract, which was not renewed. In both Ireland and the United Kingdom, it aired on Sky1 and subsidiary channels, while in Canada, it aired on CityTV and Space, CTV's sister network A-Channel and Showcase. The series was shot in the Toronto area, and includes many familiar local landmarks among its locations. As of June 2018, the series airs on the Heroes and Icons cable network.

Overview
Relic Hunter follows the globe-trotting adventures of unorthodox American archaeologist Sydney Fox (Tia Carrere), and her more reserved British assistant Nigel Bailey (Christien Anholt). They are assisted at their "home base", a generic American university identified only as Trinity College, by ditzy student secretary Claudia (Lindy Booth), the spoiled and fashion-conscious daughter of one of the college's major donors. The character of Claudia was replaced in the third season by Karen Petrushky (Tanja Reichert), who is more talented than Claudia at dealing with predicaments of a bureaucratic nature.

At the beginning of each episode, there is a short flashback in which a relic or artifact is used or abused in its original time before being lost, stolen or hidden. The show cuts to Trinity College in the present day, where Sydney and Nigel are asked to find the relic by some person or agency such as a museum, private collector (in disguise) or government. Most episodes feature the duo traveling around the globe, hunting for clues in order to find the artifact. Complications abound, often with rival relic hunters getting involved, generally giving Sydney a chance to show off her martial arts prowess. It is then up to Sydney and Nigel to seize the relic and ensure it ends up in the proper hands (such as the rightful owners or a suitable museum). Each episode ends with a scene at Trinity College explaining what has happened to the relic.

Cast and characters

Main
 Tia Carrere as Sydney Fox: The main protagonist and titular relic hunter of the series, Sydney works closely with Nigel Bailey whom she meets in the first episode and is proficient in both hand-to-hand (seen in most episodes) and weapons (seen in particular in episode thirty, "Roman Holiday") combat. She has many contacts all over the world, in the archaeological fields and otherwise and is very protective of both her assistants as well as her students and colleagues. She is willing to fly to any country without notice to fetch back, "save" or avenge them. She is officially Professor of Ancient Studies, and on the rare occasions she actually teaches, has been seen lecturing on anthropology, archaeology, and history.
 Christien Anholt as Nigel Bailey: Sydney's more reserved British teaching assistant and companion who accompanies her on her travels whilst searching for the relics. Nigel often finds himself in situations that are uncomfortable and needs Sydney's help to get out of them. This evens out as the series progresses, though. He is secretly in love with Sydney.
 Lindy Booth as Claudia (Also starring; season 1; Starring season 2): Sydney's office assistant who often helps out Sydney and Nigel from the campus back home whilst they are abroad. She sometimes plays a vital role in finding the relic and shares witty banter with Nigel. In spite of her general incompetence, she possesses a savant-like ability for organizing unorthodox and creative solutions to travel difficulties that Sydney and Nigel face, in one case arranging for them to sneak over the Angolan border disguised as Catholic missionaries. Claudia occasionally joined Sydney and Nigel in the field, most notably during their quests for Ariadne's ball of twine and Cleopatra's necklace.
 Tanja Reichert as Karen Petrushky (Season 3): Claudia's replacement for the final season. She was portrayed as far more competent than Claudia at her actual job, though she had more of a habit of getting kidnapped.

Recurring
 Tony Rosato as Stewie Harper (Episodes 1, 8, 21): Relic hunter who has a love-hate relationship with Sydney.
 Louis Mandylor as Derek Lloyd (Episodes 7, 26, 46): A CIA agent who requires Sydney's help on several occasions.
 Nancy Anne Sakovich as Cate Hemphill (Episodes 25, 34, 53; mentioned in 47, 54, 59, 66): An Interpol agent and occasional romantic interest of Nigel.
 Simon MacCorkindale as Fabrice De Viega (Episodes 47, 58, 66): Sydney's sworn enemy who killed her mentor Alistair Newel when she was ten.
 Lori Gordon (actress) as Lynette (Episodes 8, 10), a temp who occasionally fills in for Claudia on two occasions.

List of episodes

Production
The "Trinity College" campus scenes were filmed at the St. George campus at the University of Toronto in Canada. Campus landmarks prominently featured throughout the series include Victoria College and the Soldiers' Tower (directly adjacent to Hart House).

The "Antianeirai" episode ship scenes were filmed aboard HMCS Haida, the last Tribal Class destroyer in the world, when she was berthed at Ontario Place, in Toronto, Canada. For instance, the scene where Sydney finds the belt was filmed in the forward mess deck. All onboard signage was covered with Russian words. Haida has a red maple leaf on one of her funnels and this was covered with a "bird" design. Anything that would show the ship to be of Canadian, or "western" origin, was removed for the film shoot.

All seasons were filmed in widescreen 16:9 but mainly shown in pan and scan 4/3 as are most of Fireworks Entertainment productions from 2000. The widescreen versions of all seasons are available for viewing at Netflix in Nordics as of 2012.

International distribution
Relic Hunter was broadcast in many countries around the world including:

 Australia "Relic Hunter" (Fox8)
 Austria "Relic Hunter – Die Schatzjägerin" (ATV+)
 Belgium "Relic Hunter" (VTM4)
 Bosnia & Herzegovina "Lovac na blago" (FTV)
 Brazil "Caçadora de Reliquias" (RecordTV and Rede Bandeirantes)
 Bulgaria "Търсач на реликви" (AXN), "Ловци на реликви" (TV7 and Super 7) - July 16, 2010 and "Търсачи на реликви" (BNT 1) - June 17, 2019
 Croatia "Pustolovine Sydney Fox" (NOVA)
 Cyprus "Sydney Fox Adventures" (Sigma TV)
 Czech Republic "Lovci pokladů" (Nova, Prima, AXN)
 Denmark "Relic Hunter" (Kanal 5)
 Estonia "Aardekütt" (Kanal 11)
 Finland "Aarteenmetsästäjä" (Nelonen, TV5/The Voice)
 France "Sydney Fox, l'aventurière" (M6, W9, Gulli)
 Galicia, Spain "Cazatesouros" (TVG)
 Georgia "რელიქვიების მაძიებელი" (GPB)
 Germany "Relic Hunter – Die Schatzjägerin" (Pro7, AXN, Kabel Eins, Tele5)
 Greece "Sydney Fox Adventures" (Star Channel, Alter Channel)
 Hungary "Az elveszett ereklyék fosztogatói" (means: The Raiders Of The Lost Relics) (TV2 and now AXN)
 India "Relic Hunter" (AXN)
 Israel "אוצרות מן העבר" (Treasures From the Past)(AXN and now HOT Zone)
 Italy "Relic Hunter" (Italia 1) (Paramount Channel (international)) 
 Latin America "Relic Hunter" (AXN)
 Netherlands "Relic Hunter" Yorin
 New Zealand "Relic Hunter" TV2
 Norway "Skattejegerne" (The treasure hunters) (TV Norge)
 Poland "Łowcy skarbów" (The treasure hunters) (TV4)/"Zagadki z przeszłości" (The Mysteries of the Past) (AXN)
 Portugal "A Caçadora de Reliquias" (Sony Entertainment Television)
 Romania "Vanatorii de comori"(AXN, TVR 2)
 Russia "Охотники за древностями" (CTC)
 Serbia "Ловац на благо" (FOX)
 Slovakia "Lovkyňa Tajomstiev" (Markíza, Joj)
 Slovenia "Lov za zakladom" (Kanal A)
 South Africa "Relic Hunter" (SABC)
 Spain "Cazatesoros" (Telecinco)
 Sri Lanka "Relic Hunter" (ITN)
 Sweden "Kultjägarna" (Kanal 5)
 Taiwan "奪寶女英豪" (AXN)
 Turkey "Gizem Avcısı" (Tv8 (Turkey), TRT, Olay TV )
 Ukraine "Мисливці за старовиною" (ICTV) / "Мисливці за реликвіями" ([K1]; 2+2)
 United Kingdom Sky1, Sky2, Sky3, Pick "Relic Hunter"
 Vietnam "Truy tìm cổ vật" (Finding Treasures) HTV7

Home media
Alliance Home Entertainment has released all three seasons of Relic Hunter on DVD in Region 1 (Canada only).

In Region 4, Warner Home Video released season 1 on DVD in Australia in two volume sets in 2005. Madman Entertainment subsequently acquired the rights and released the second season on DVD in 2006 and the third season in 2010. A complete Season 1 box set was released by Madman on February 2, 2011.

See also
 Bonekickers
 Veritas: The Quest

References

External links
 

1999 Canadian television series debuts
2002 Canadian television series endings
1990s Canadian drama television series
2000s Canadian drama television series
1990s mystery television series
2000s mystery television series
Treasure hunt television series
Television shows filmed in Toronto
First-run syndicated television programs in the United States
Television series by CBS Studios
Canadian action adventure television series
Canadian mystery television series
Canadian fantasy television series
Archaeology in popular culture